Trocka  is a Warsaw Metro station in Warsaw's Targówek district. It is part of the extension of Line M2 from Dworzec Wileński to Targówek, with construction started in 2016. All three stations opened on September 15, 2019.

History
On March 11, 2016, a 1 billion zł (€225 million) contract was awarded to the Italian company, Astaldi to build the first phase of the North-East second subway line extension with 3.2 kilometres (2.0 mi) of track and 3 stations: Szwedzka, Targówek and Trocka. On April 30, construction on Szwedzka station started, and on May 2, the other two stations started construction.

Construction site

External links
Detailed map of  Line M2 from official Warsaw Metro site

References 

Railway stations in Poland opened in 2019
Line 2 (Warsaw Metro) stations
Targówek